was a blue-gray form of stoneware pottery fired at high temperature, which was produced in Japan and southern Korea during the Kofun, Nara, and Heian periods of Japanese history. It was initially used for funerary and ritual objects, and originated from Korea to Kyūshū. Although the roots of Sueki reach back to ancient China, its direct precursor is the grayware of the Three Kingdoms of Korea.

History 
The term Sue was coined in the 1930s by the archaeologist Shuichi Goto (:ja:後藤守一) from a reference to vessels mentioned in the 8th century Japanese classical poetry anthology Man'yōshū. Previous to this, the terms  or Chosen doki were in more common use.

Sue pottery is believed to have originated in the 5th or 6th century in the Kaya region of southern Korea, and was brought to Japan by immigrant craftsmen. It was contemporary with the native Japanese Haji pottery, which was more porous and reddish in color. Sue ware was made from coils of clay, beaten and smoothed or carved into shape, and then fired in an oxygen-reduction atmosphere of over 1000 °C. The resulting stoneware was generally unglazed, but sometimes displays an accidental partial covering of ash glaze, which melted in drips onto the ceramic pieces' surfaces as they were being fired.

Sue pottery was produced in numerous locations around Japan, including southern Osaka prefecture, along the coast of the Inland Sea and parts of eastern Honshū. It was used for the roof tiles of the Kokubunji system of Provincial temples erected in the Nara period. By the end of early 7th century, its position as an elite product was eroded by mass production, and by the imports of the new three-color ceramics from Tang China. By the Heian period, Sue ware had become a utilitarian pottery, and it became the ancestor of a number of regional ceramics such as Bizen ware.

References

Further reading
 Wilson, Richard L (1999). Inside Japanese Ceramics: Primer of Materials, Techniques, and Traditions. Weatherhill, .
 Honolulu Academy of Arts (2005). Yakimono: 4000 years of Japanese Ceramics. Honolulu Academy of Arts, .
 Sanders, Herbert H.; Tomimoto, Kenkichi (1967) “The World of Japanese Ceramics”. Kodansha America, Inc,

External links 

Japanese pottery
Heian period
Kofun period
Nara period